WUPF (107.3 FM) is a radio station licensed to Powers, Michigan and currently broadcasts a classic rock format as "Eagle 107.3 FM". The station is currently owned by Armada Media Corporation, through licensee AMC Partners Escanaba, LLC, and was granted its license on March 2, 2008. After going silent for the first six months the station signed on in September, 2008 with its current calls and a broad-based variety hits format.  The station had been assigned WXPT since 2006.

References
Michiguide.com - WUPF History

External links

UPF
Classic rock radio stations in the United States
Radio stations established in 1985
1985 establishments in Michigan